Janine Massard (born November 13, 1939) is a Swiss writer from the Vaud canton.

She was born in Rolle and began studies in literature at Lausanne, leaving after three semesters. From 2002 to 2009, she was president of the Association Films Plans-Fixes.

She married Maurice Ehinger; he died in 1994. From 1965 to 1969, she was a member of the Swiss Party of Labour, known as Parti ouvrier et populaire (POP) in Vaud. Massard received the Prix culturels vaudois for literature in 2007.

Selected works 
 Terre noire d'usine, non-fiction
 Trois mariages, non-fiction, won the Prix des Ecrivains vaudois
 Ce qui reste de Katharina, novel, received the Prix de la Bibliothèque pour Tous in 1998
 Un Jardin face à la France, novel (2006)
 Childéric et Cathy sont dans un bateau, stories (2010)
 Gens du Lac, novel

References 

1939 births
Living people
Swiss women novelists
20th-century Swiss novelists
21st-century Swiss novelists
Swiss women short story writers
Swiss short story writers
21st-century Swiss women writers
20th-century Swiss women writers
People from Rolle